The unchained camera technique ( in German) was an innovation by cinematographer Karl Freund that allowed for filmmakers to get shots from cameras in motion, enabling them to use pan shots, tracking shots, tilts, crane shots, etc.

Though films such as 1923's Sylvester: Tragödie einer Nach pre-date it, the technique was expanded and popularized by Freund in the 1924 silent film, The Last Laugh, and is arguably the most important stylistic innovation of the 20th century, setting the stage for some of the most commonly used cinematic techniques of modern contemporary cinema.

References 

Cinematography
Cinematic techniques